Wide World of Sports is an Australian sports television program. It was broadcast on the Nine Network.

The show originally aired from 23 May 1981, until the end of 1999. After a nine-year hiatus, it returned on 16 March 2008 and had its last episode in 2016 following Ken Sutcliffe's retirement. It was replaced by a new sport talk show Sports Sunday airing its first episode on 5 March 2017.

History

1981-1999 - Weekly shows
Wide World of Sports (WWoS) is a long-used title for Nine's sport programming. All sports broadcasts on Nine air under the WWoS brand. It was also the name of a popular sports magazine program that aired most Saturdays and Sundays. This program filled many of the summer daytime hours. The program premiered at 1:00 pm on Saturday, 23 May 1981, and was initially hosted by Mike Gibson and Ian Chappell, before being hosted in the 1990s by Max Walker and Ken Sutcliffe. Ian Maurice was the regular anchor at the WWOS Update Desk. The show ended in 1999, due in large part to the rise of Fox Sports (which Nine's owner owned half of) and other subscription sport channels, but the show returned in 2008 on Sunday mornings.

It was unrelated to the series Wide World of Sports aired by ABC in the United States, which started in 1961.

In the early 1980s, well-known hosts and presenters on Wide World of Sports included Mike Gibson and Ian Chappell, both the inaugural hosts of the Saturday afternoon program in 1981. Billy Birmingham in 1984 released a comedy album that satirized cricket "and in particular Channel Nine’s iconic commentary team with Richie Benaud the central figure," which became popular in Australia, A later album was called The Wired World of Sports. Among the hosts satirized were his friend Mike Gibson. The television show won "Most Popular Sports Program" at the Logie Awards in 1986.

In 1990s, the Wide World of Sports marketed sports paraphernalia such as signed and framed bats, and items from the Australian Rugby League. Paul Sheahan hosted Nine's Wide World of Sports program until 1999. Max Walker hosted until it ended in 1999.

2008-2020 - Show's return to TV
After a ten-year hiatus, it was announced that the Wide World of Sports weekly television program would return to Nine on 16 March 2008, using the same theme song as the old version, as well as accessing old footage for replays. This show was hosted by the previous host Ken Sutcliffe, with footy show star James Brayshaw as well as former Australian cricketer Adam Gilchrist. Revolving co-hosts included former swimmers Giaan Rooney, Nicole Livingstone and former cricketer Michael Slater. The show originally aired for 90 minutes but was recently extended to two hours. It aired on Sunday mornings at 9am till 11am.

In 2009, Grant Hackett and Michael Slater joined the team as co-hosts alongside Sutcliffe and Rooney.

After she was fired in 2014 as a cost-cutting measure, in 2016 Emma Freedman again signed up with Channel Nine's Wide World of Sports as an announcer. The weekly show was no longer airing as of 2017. Sports Sunday replaced the show in the Sunday 10am time slot.

In 2019, it broadcast the Australian Open with its own team of commentators.

Macquarie Media in 2020 began airing an hour-long Wide World of Sports radio broadcast hosted by Mark Levy.

Hosts

Past
 Ian Chappell 
 Lisa Curry 
 Sally Fitzgibbons
 Emma Freedman
 Ian Maurice 
 Mike Gibson 
 Tony Greig 
 Max Walker
 Adam Gilchrist
 Giaan Rooney
 Yvonne Sampson
 Michael Slater
 Clint Stanaway
 John Steffenson
 Ken Sutcliffe
 Richie Calendar

Awards
The show won the Logie Award for the Most Popular Sports Program in 1987, and was nominated for every year from 2009 to 2017.

See also

References

External links
Wide World of Sports home page.

Nine's Wide World of Sport
1981 Australian television series debuts
1999 Australian television series endings
2008 Australian television series debuts
2016 Australian television series endings
English-language television shows
Australian sports television series